Michu of Silla was the thirteenth ruler of the Korean state of Silla (r. 262–284).  He was the first king of the Kim clan to sit on the Silla throne; this clan would hold the throne for most of Silla's later history.  He was the son of Gudo, a leading Silla general, and the sixth-generation descendant of the clan founder Kim Alji. 

During Michu's reign, the Samguk Sagi reports numerous attacks from Baekje, and does not mention any contact with the other neighboring states.

Michu's tomb is preserved in central Gyeongju today.  Various legends pertain to this burial mound, which is known as the Jukjangneung, or "Bamboo chief tomb."

Family 
Father: Gudo Galmunwang (구도 갈문왕)
Mother: Queen Sullye  (술례부인 박씨), of the Park clan, daughter of Ichil Galmunwang (이칠 갈문왕)
Wife: 
Queen Gwangmyeong (광명부인 석씨), of the Seok Clan, daughter of Jobun of Silla
Daughter: Lady Boban (보반부인), wife of King Naemul of Silla
Daughter: Queen Aryu, of the Kim clan (아류부인 김씨), wife of King Silseong of Silla

Achievement
Although records of his era are not abundant, he seemed to have large interests on agriculture. In 264, he visited the peasant people to encourage them during a severe famine. In 268, subjects were dispatched by Michu to hear concerns of people.

Additionally, he was quite compassionate in that he turned down the requirement of rebuilding palaces for the reason that the people shouldn't labor too much.

Legend 
It is a legend that the spirit of King Michu helped Silla and protected the country by appeasing the spirit of Kim Yu-sin, who unified the Three Kingdoms. During the reign of King Yurye of Silla, people from Iseoguk(伊西國)(present-day Cheongdo County) attacked Gyeongju, and Silla was powerless. Then, soldiers with bamboo leaves in their ears appeared and turned the state of war around. After the enemy's retreat, a pile of bamboo leaves piled up in front of the tombs of the King Michu.
So, the tomb of Michu was called Jukhyeongneung or Jukjangneung, meaning "the tomb of bamboo generals.

See also
Three Kingdoms of Korea
Rulers of Korea
History of Korea

References

Silla rulers
284 deaths
Gim clan of Gyeongju
3rd-century monarchs in Asia
Year of birth unknown
3rd-century Korean people